Lillings Ambo is a civil parish in the Ryedale district of North Yorkshire, England. It is between the villages of Strensall and Sheriff Hutton, and its southern edge is the border between Ryedale and the City of York Unitary Authority. The River Foss flows through the parish, and in 2020, a scheme was approved to build a leaky dam to store water in the south of the parish in times of flood.

History
The civil parish has the village of West Lilling, and areas to the south known as Lilling Green. The first part of the name derives from Old English of Lillingas, meaning the place of Lilla's people. The suffix Ambo, also seen in the nearby parish of Huttons Ambo, is a Latin term usually denoting that the parish is made up of two villages sharing a common name: West and East Lilling (or Lillings Both). West and East Lilling were both mentioned in the Domesday Book with East Lilling being recorded as completely depopulated by 1625, though probably, most inhabitants had left by 1485. The fields in the parish, especially those around West Lilling were enclosed by 1769.

The village of West Lilling consists of around 45 buildings, but the old village of East Lilling is now in the civil parish of Sheriff Hutton, although two listed buildings in the Lillings Ambo parish are labelled as East Lilling.

Land within the parish is largely agricultural, with various ponds acting as a good reserve for great crested newts, one of a handful of sites in Ryedale where they still thrive. The River Foss flows through the parish (from west to south-east) and in the 18th century, the river was canalised in an effort to make it navigable to Sheriff Hutton Bridge (which despite its name, is in the parish of Lillings Ambo). The meandering of the river before it was canalised, allowed for it to be forded in several places in the parish. The scheme is designed to protect almost 500 properties downstream, with work due to be finished by September 2023.

The long-distance walks, the Centenary Way, the Ebor Way, and the Foss Walk, all pass through the Lillings Ambo.

Local authority
Lillings Ambo was a township in the ecclesiastical parish of Sheriff Hutton in the 19th century, which itself, was part of the wapentake of Bulmer. The population in the late 1830s was recorded as 197. It was additionally within one of the York poor law unions (Flaxton District), and was created as civil parish in 1866, later coming under the Flaxton Rural District.

In 2001 the population of the parish was 147, which had risen to 158 at the 2011 census. In 2015, North Yorkshire County Council estimated the population to be 150. The parish falls under the Sheriff Hutton Ward for local elections, and under the Thirsk and Malton constituency, which was formerly the Ryedale Constituency). The southern edge of the parish, shares a border with the City of York Unitary Authority boundary.

References

External links
Parish website
2011 Census sheet

Civil parishes in North Yorkshire
Ryedale